Keszthely is a district in eastern part of Zala County. Keszthely is also the name of the town where the district seat is found. The district is located in the Western Transdanubia Statistical Region.

Geography 
Keszthely District borders with Zalaszentgrót District and Sümeg District (Veszprém County) to the north, Tapolca District (Veszprém County) to the east, Marcali District (Somogy County) and Nagykanizsa District to the south, Zalaegerszeg District to the west. The number of the inhabited places in Keszthely District is 30.

Municipalities 
The district has 2 towns, 2 large villages and 26 villages.
(ordered by population, as of 1 January 2013)

The bolded municipalities are cities, italics municipalities are large villages.

See also
List of cities and towns in Hungary

References

External links
 Postal codes of the Keszthely District

Districts in Zala County